Pool may refer to:

Water pool
 Swimming pool, usually an artificial structure containing a large body of water intended for swimming
 Reflecting pool, a shallow pool designed to reflect a structure and its surroundings
 Tide pool, a rocky pool on an ocean shore that remains filled with seawater when the tide goes out
 Salt pannes and pools, a water-retaining depression located within salt and brackish marshes
 Plunge pool, a small, deep body of water
 Stream pool, a quiet slow-moving portion of a stream
 Spent fuel pool, a storage facility for used fuel rods from a nuclear reactor

Sports and gambling
 Pool (cards), the common pot for stakes or the stakes themselves in card games
 Pool (dominoes), the stock or boneyard in dominoes
 Pool (cue sports), a group of games played on a pool table
 Pool (poker) or pot (poker), money wagered during a single hand of poker
 Pool betting or parimutuel betting, a betting system in which all bets of a particular type are placed together
 Betting pool, a form of pool betting where gamblers pay a fixed price into a pool 
 Football pool, an association football (soccer) betting pool
 Pool play or group stages, the round-robin stage of many sporting championships
 Singapore Pools, Singapore's sole legal lottery

Computing
 Pool (computer science), a set of initialized resources that are kept ready to use
 Connection pool, a cache of database connections maintained by the database
 Memory pool, a dynamic memory allocation method
 Memory Pool System, a memory management system by Harlequin
 Object pool pattern, a pattern to construct sets of initialized programming objects that are kept ready to use
 Thread pool pattern, a programming method where a number of threads are created to perform a number of tasks
 Pooling layer, a form of non-linear down-sampling in convolutional neural networks

Media

Music
 Pool (John Zorn album), 1980
 Pool (Porches album), 2016
 "Pool", a song by Paramore from After Laughter

Film
 The Pool (2001 film), German horror film also known as Swimming Pool
 The Pool (2007 film), co-written and directed by Chris Smith
 The Pool (2009 film), adaptation of the 2006 play
 The Pool (2018 film), Thai survival thriller film
 Pool (film), a 2007 short film

Other
 The Pool (play), by James Brough and Helen Elizabeth, 2006
 Pool (website), a defunct Australian Broadcasting Corporation social media site

Places

England
 Pool, Cornwall, on the mainland, England
 Pool, Isles of Scilly, a location in Cornwall, England
 Pool-in-Wharfedale, in West Yorkshire, England
 Pool of London, a stretch of the River Thames
 River Pool (London), a river in England, tributary to the River Ravensbourne
 River Pool, Cumbria, a river in Cumbria, England, tributary to the Gilpin

United States
 Pool, West Virginia, United States
 The Pool (Central Park) in Manhattan, New York, United States

Other
 Pool Department, a division of the Republic of the Congo

Other uses
 Pool (surname), a surname (and list of people with the surname)
 Pooling (resource management), grouping together of resources or effort
 Press pool, group of news gathering organizations pooling their resources
 Secretarial pool, group of secretaries available to assist executives

See also
 Poel, an island in the Baltic Sea
 Poole (disambiguation)
 Poul, a given name
 pooling, or pool testing, in statistics